Allen Bernard Hurns (born November 12, 1991) is an American football wide receiver who is a free agent. He was signed by the Jacksonville Jaguars as an undrafted free agent in 2014. He played college football at the University of Miami.

Early years
Hurns attended Miami Carol City Senior High School in Miami, Florida. He played high school football as a wide receiver and ran track. As a junior, he totaled 23 receptions for 450 yards and seven touchdowns. As a senior, he collected six receptions for 110 yards, before suffering a season-ending injury.

In track, he ran a career-best time of 11.69 seconds in the 100 meters at the 2006 Broward County Championships, where he placed 4th. He placed 3rd in the 400 meters at the 2008 Hallandale Invitational, setting a personal-best time of 50.30 seconds. At the 2008 FHSAA 4A Region 4 Meet, he recorded a career-best time of 22.11 seconds in the 200 meters, placing 7th in the prelims.

Regarded as a three-star recruit by Rivals.com, Hurns was ranked as one of top 100 wide receivers in the nation by Scout.com.

College career
Hurns accepted a football scholarship from the University of Miami. As a true freshman, he appeared in nine games focusing on special teams, while registering four tackles. As a sophomore, he started seven out of 12 games, tallying 31 receptions (third on the team) for 415 yards (third on the team), a 13.4-yard average and four touchdowns.

As a junior, he missed spring practice while recovering from surgery to fix a torn labrum. He started 8 out of 11 games, making 28 receptions (fourth on the team) for 314 yards (sixth on the team), an 11.2-yard average and four touchdowns. He did not play in the third game against Bethune-Cookman University because of a concussion. He suffered a broken left thumb in the tenth game against the University of Virginia.

As a senior, he started 11 out of 13 games, leading the team with 62 receptions for 1,162 yards (18.7-yard avg.) and six touchdowns. He also received the Jack Harding Award as the Hurricanes Most Valuable Player, after setting the school single-season record with 1,162 receiving yards.

During his collegiate career, he started 26 of 45 games and had 121 receptions for 1,891 yards and 14 touchdowns for the Hurricanes.

College statistics

Professional career

Jacksonville Jaguars

2014 season: Rookie year

On May 11, 2014, the Jacksonville Jaguars signed Hurns as an undrafted free agent to a three-year, $1.54 million contract that includes a signing bonus of $5,000.

On September 7, he became the first rookie wide receiver in franchise history to start in a season opener. Playing against the Philadelphia Eagles, Hurns caught four passes for 110 yards and two touchdowns from quarterback Chad Henne. His first two receptions in the first quarter both went for touchdowns, making Hurns only the second wide receiver in NFL history to record touchdowns on his first two catches (Charles Rogers of the Detroit Lions was the other in 2003), and the first rookie to ever score two receiving touchdowns in the first quarter of his first game. In his rookie season, Hurns recorded 51 receptions for 677 yards and six touchdowns.

2015 season
On November 29, 2015, Hurns was hospitalized after a head injury during Week 11 against the San Diego Chargers by hitting his head after attempting a diving catch. He was released from the hospital later that day. Hurns did not practice on December 3, 2015, and remained in concussion protocol. On December 4, 2015, the Jaguars announced that Hurns would not play in Week 13 against the Tennessee Titans. Hurns finished the 2015 season with 64 receptions, 1,031 yards and 10 touchdowns, which all remain his current career highs. As of 2015, Hurns holds the record for most touchdowns in first two seasons for an undrafted free agent in NFL history (16), and was the only wide receiver to score a touchdown in seven straight games, all while playing with a sports hernia. He was ranked 89th by his fellow players on the NFL Top 100 Players of 2016.

2016 season
On June 2, 2016, Hurns signed a four-year, $40 million contract extension with $16 million guaranteed.

Hurns regressed in the 2016 season from his successful season the previous year. He started and appeared in every game up until Week 13. On October 2, he caught his first touchdown of the season against the Indianapolis Colts. On October 27, Hurns caught seven passes for a season-high 98 yards and a touchdown against the Tennessee Titans. In Week 12 against the Buffalo Bills, he caught his third touchdown of the season. He suffered a hamstring injury against the Buffalo Bills that sidelined him for the final 5 games of the season. The Jaguars finished with a record of 3-13 and did not qualify for the playoffs. In 11 games, he posted career-lows in total receptions (35), receiving yards (477), and touchdowns (3).

2017 season
In the season opener against the Houston Texans, Hurns' teammate Allen Robinson was lost for the season due to a torn ACL. As a result, Hurns had to step up in the offense. During Week 2 against the Tennessee Titans, he recorded six receptions for 82 yards and his first touchdown of the season. The next week against the Baltimore Ravens, he caught another touchdown. The last time a Jaguar caught a touchdown in consecutive games was Marqise Lee in November 2016. On October 22, Hurns caught five passes against the Indianapolis Colts and topped 100 yards for the first time since December 2015. On his 26th birthday, Hurns caught a season high seven passes for seventy yards but left the game with an ankle injury against the Los Angeles Chargers. He was declared inactive from the tenth to the fifteenth game of the season with an ankle injury. The Jaguars finished with a 10–6 record and made the playoffs for the first time since 2007. Hurns was shutout in the Wild Card Round win against the Buffalo Bills and only caught one pass in the Divisional Round win against the Pittsburgh Steelers. In the AFC Championship against the New England Patriots, he caught six passes for 80 yards. Hurns' 80 yards were the most receiving yards by a Jaguar in the playoffs since Matt Jones in 2006. Including playoffs, Hurns finished the season with 46 catches for 576 yards and a career-low two touchdowns.

On March 20, 2018, Hurns was released by the Jaguars.

Dallas Cowboys
On March 23, 2018, Hurns signed a two-year contract with the Dallas Cowboys worth up to $12 million, who were looking to upgrade their receiving corps after releasing wide receiver Dez Bryant on April 13. Hurns changed his jersey number to 17 to honor the Parkland Shooting victims.

During the season, Hurns was expected to be the main starter as part of a wide-receiver-by-committee approach. He was a backup behind Terrance Williams in the season-opening 16-8 road loss to the Carolina Panthers, where he had one catch for 20 yards. Hurns was named the starter over Williams in the second game against the New York Giants. During Week 5, Hurns scored his first touchdown of the season on a 3-yard pass from Dak Prescott as the Cowboys lost to the Houston Texans on the road in overtime by a score of 19–16. Hurns' production and effectiveness would continue to decrease in the following games.

Hurns was used very sparingly in the latter half of the season, losing his starting position after the Cowboys traded a 2019 first-round draft choice to the Oakland Raiders in exchange for Amari Cooper on October 22, to take over the number one receiver role and also gave more playing time to rookie Michael Gallup. In the season finale against the New York Giants, Hurns had a 49-yard reception as the Cowboys narrowly won 36–35. Hurns finished the regular season setting career-lows in receptions (20) and receiving yards (295). He tied a career-low in receiving touchdowns with two.

On January 5, 2019, Hurns suffered a serious ankle injury after being tackled by Seattle Seahawks safety Bradley McDougald, in the first quarter of the Wild Card Round of the NFC playoffs. His left foot was turned 90 degrees outward as he laid on the ground and had to be popped back into place by doctors. It was later revealed that Hurns suffered a dislocated ankle and a broken fibula, forcing him to miss the rest of the playoffs. He was placed on injured reserve on January 8, 2019.

On July 23, 2019, Hurns was released by the Cowboys due to salary cap reasons after the team asked him to reduce his salary and he declined.

Miami Dolphins
On July 26, 2019, Hurns signed a one-year deal with the Miami Dolphins, his hometown team.

During a Week 8 14-27 road loss to the Pittsburgh Steelers, Hurns caught his first touchdown of the season on a 12-yard reception from Ryan Fitzpatrick. He missed the fourth game against the Los Angeles Chargers with a concussion. On November 16, 2019, he signed a two-year extension with the Dolphins worth $8 million with $3.27 million guaranteed.

He finished his first season with the Dolphins with 32 receptions for 416 yards and two touchdowns.

Hurns chose to opt-out of the 2020 season due to the COVID-19 pandemic on August 4, 2020.

On August 17, 2021, Hurns was placed on season-ending injured reserve.

On March 24, 2022, Hurns was released by the Dolphins.

NFL career statistics

Regular season

Postseason

References

External links

Miami Hurricanes bio

1991 births
Living people
American football wide receivers
Dallas Cowboys players
Jacksonville Jaguars players
Miami Dolphins players
Miami Hurricanes football players
Players of American football from Miami
Miami Carol City Senior High School alumni